The Isaac Bargen House is a historic house located in Mountain Lake, Minnesota, Minnesota, United States, built in 1888.

Description and history 
It was originally built as the house Isaac A. Bargen (1857–1943), a transformational educator and administrator who was one of the first in his Mennonite community to promote secular public education and government service. The house was added to the National Register of Historic Places on June 13, 1986.

See also
 National Register of Historic Places listings in Cottonwood County

References

Houses completed in 1888
Houses in Cottonwood County, Minnesota
Houses on the National Register of Historic Places in Minnesota
Queen Anne architecture in Minnesota
National Register of Historic Places in Cottonwood County, Minnesota
1888 establishments in Minnesota
Mennonitism in the United States